Pseudohemihyalea daraba is a moth in the family Erebidae. It was described by Herbert Druce in 1894. It is found in Mexico.

References

Moths described in 1894
daraba
Arctiinae of South America